{{speciesbox
|name = Fuchsia gum
|image =Eucalyptus forrestiana.jpg
|image_caption =
|status_system = 
|status = 
|genus = Eucalyptus
|species = forrestiana
|authority = Diels
|synonyms_ref = 
|synonyms = Eucalyptus forrestiana  Diels forrestiana
}}Eucalyptus forrestiana, commonly known as fuchsia gum or fuchsia mallee, is a species of small tree or mallet and is endemic to an area near Esperance, Western Australia. It has smooth grey bark, narrow oblong to lance-shaped adult leaves, flower buds that are square in cross-section, red at maturity and arranged singly in leaf axils, yellow flowers and four-angled, winged fruit.

It has smooth grey over pale brown bark and a dense dark green canopy. Flowering occurs from January to March or from April to June and the flowers are yellow.

TaxonomyEucalyptus forrestiana was first formally described in 1904 by the botanist Ludwig Diels in the journal Botanische Jahrbücher für Systematik, Pflanzengeschichte und Pflanzengeographie, in an article jointly authored with Georg August Pritzel. The specific epithet (forrestiana) honours "Sir John Forrest", explorer, botanical collector and later the first Premier of Western Australia and member of the first Federal Parliament.

Distribution
Fuchsia gum is found around salt lakes and on sand plains in a small area in near-coastal between Ravensthorpe and Cape Arid National Park, extending inland as far as Mt. Nye and Mt. Beaumont in Western Australia, where it grows in clay-sandy soils.

Conservation status
This eucalypt is classified as "not threatened" by the Western Australian Government Department of Parks and Wildlife.

Use in horticultureEucalyptus forrestiana'' is commonly used as a small street tree in semi-arid areas due to its highly decorative appearance.

See also
List of Eucalyptus species

References

Eucalypts of Western Australia
forrestiana
Myrtales of Australia
Mallees (habit)
Plants described in 1904
Taxa named by Ludwig Diels
Endemic flora of Southwest Australia